Mordechai Nisan is an Israeli professor, member of the World Zionist Organization, and scholar of Middle East Studies at the Rothberg International School of the Hebrew University of Jerusalem. His most recent book, Only Israel West of the River: The Jewish State and the Palestinian Question, appeared in July 2011.

Academic career
Nisan has written extensively in English and Hebrew. Other books include Identity and Civilization: Essays on Judaism, Christianity and Islam (1999) Minorities in the Middle East: A History of Struggle and Self-Expression (2002) and The Conscience of Lebanon: A Political Biography of Etienne Sakr (Abu-Arz) (2003). He holds a Ph.D. from McGill University in Montreal, Quebec, Canada. He has been described as a proponent of the counter-jihadist worldview of Bat Ye'or.

Published works

"The Syrian occupation of Lebanon", NATIV, Ariel Center for Policy Research, Volume Thirteen, Number 3 (74), June 2000.
 
"The War of Islam Against Minorities in the Middle East," in Muhammad's Monsters, 2004
"Kadima's Treachery Must be Punished at the Polls"  March 27, 2006

 (1977): The Arab-Israeli Conflict, A Political Guide for the Perplexed. The Joshua Group.
 (1978): Israel and the Territories A study in Control 1967-1977. Ramat Gan: Turtledove. .
 (1982): American Middle East Foreign Policy: A Political Reevaluation. Griffin, GA: Dawn Pub. Co. .
 (1991): Toward A New Israel: The Jewish State and the Arab Question. New York: AMS Press. .
 (1999): Identity and Civilization: Essays on Judaism, Christianity, and Islam. University Press of America. .
 (2002): Minorities in the Middle East: A History of Struggle and Self-Expression (2nd ed.). McFarland & Company. .
 (2003): The Conscience of Lebanon: A Political Biography of Etienne Sakr (Abu-Arz). London: Routledge Publishers. .
 (2011): Only Israel West of the River: The Jewish State and the Palestinian Question. Createspace.com. .

References

Year of birth missing (living people)
Living people
Counter-jihad activists
Academic staff of the Hebrew University of Jerusalem
Israeli Jews
Historians of the Middle East
Jewish historians
Israeli historians
Israeli male writers
McGill University alumni